The India cricket team toured Zimbabwe in August 2022 to play three One Day International (ODI) matches. The ODI series formed part of the inaugural 2020–2023 ICC Cricket World Cup Super League. Originally the series was scheduled to be played in August 2020, but, in June 2020, the Board of Control for Cricket in India (BCCI) confirmed that it had called off the tour due to the COVID-19 pandemic. However, in July 2022, the series was rescheduled to be played in August 2022. All the matches took place at the Harare Sports Club.

Shikhar Dhawan was initially named as India's captain. However, on August 11, BCCI released a media brief stating that KL Rahul would lead the team as he has cleared all medical tests, with Dhawan named as his deputy.

Squads

Washington Sundar was ruled out of the Indian squad due to a shoulder injury attained while he was playing for Lancashire in a 2022 Royal London One-Day Cup game. Shahbaz Ahmed was announced as his replacement.

ODI series

1st ODI

2nd ODI

3rd ODI

See also
 Impact of the COVID-19 pandemic on cricket

References

External links
 Series home at ESPN Cricinfo

2022 in Indian cricket
2022 in Zimbabwean cricket
International cricket competitions in 2022
Indian cricket tours of Zimbabwe
Cricket events postponed due to the COVID-19 pandemic